Leucas kishenensis is a species of flowering plant in the family Lamiaceae. It is found only in Yemen. Its natural habitat is subtropical or tropical dry shrubland.

References

kishenensis
Endemic flora of Socotra
Least concern plants
Taxonomy articles created by Polbot